Ramadan Yasser Abdel Ghaffar (born July 19, 1980 in Gharbîya el-Saqriya, Al-Wadi Al-Jadid) is a boxer from Egypt.

Career
Yasser won the gold medal in the men's middleweight division at the 1999 All-Africa Games and went to the Olympics 2000 where he lost his first match 7:8 to Korea's Im Jung-Bin. In 2003, he repeated his win at the All-Africa Games in Abuja, Nigeria.

Yasser also participated at the 2004 Summer Olympics for his native North African country. There, he was beaten in the quarterfinals of the middleweight (– 75 kg) division by Kazakhstan's world champion and eventual runner-up Gennady Golovkin.

In 2007, he won the All Africa Games as a light heavyweight. Yasser reached the quarterfinals of the 2007 AIBA World Boxing Championships in Chicago, fighting in the Light Heavyweight (81 kg) division. After having a bye in the first round, Yasser then defeated Jack Badou of Sweden (PTS 18:9) in the Preliminaries, and PanAm champion Eleider Alvarez of Colombia (KO R4 1:10) in the Round of 16, both of whom also had a bye in the first round before losing to Daugirdas Semiotas on points 9:18.

At the 2008 Summer Olympics he was upset by Abdelhafid Benchabla:  6:13.

References
2007 results
 sports-reference

1980 births
Living people
Middleweight boxers
Boxers at the 2000 Summer Olympics
Boxers at the 2004 Summer Olympics
Boxers at the 2008 Summer Olympics
Olympic boxers of Egypt
Egyptian male boxers

Mediterranean Games gold medalists for Egypt
Competitors at the 2001 Mediterranean Games
African Games gold medalists for Egypt
African Games medalists in boxing
Mediterranean Games medalists in boxing
Competitors at the 1999 All-Africa Games
Competitors at the 2003 All-Africa Games
Competitors at the 2007 All-Africa Games
People from New Valley Governorate